Liam John Hughes (born 11 September 1988) is an English former professional football striker. He drifted out of the professional game after being released by Wolverhampton Wanderers in 2009.

Career
Hughes was a product of the Wolves academy, but failed to make a first team appearance after signing professional forms in 2007. He had a two-month loan spell at League Two side Bury in November 2007, making his Football League début on 24 November 2007 as a substitute in a 2–1 defeat at Morecambe. To date, Hughes has only made three further appearances at league level.

After failing to convince his parent club, he was released in early 2009. In July 2009, Hughes featured as a trialist for Hereford United in their pre-season friendly against local rivals Pegasus Juniors, but was not offered a contract. Instead he continued his playing career with non-league Pensnett United, while also entering full-time work.

In June 2010 he was jailed for up for 32 months for his part in an armed robbery in his hometown of Gornal on 13 February 2010.

References

External links
 
 
 

1988 births
Living people
English footballers
Association football forwards
English Football League players
National League (English football) players
Wolverhampton Wanderers F.C. players
Bury F.C. players
Stafford Rangers F.C. players
People from Gornal, West Midlands